Helicostylum elegans is a species of fungi in the family Mucoraceae.

References

External links 
 Helicostylum elegans at IndexFungorum

Mucoraceae
Fungi described in 1842
Taxa named by August Carl Joseph Corda